Ikom is an Upper Cross River language of Nigeria. There are three varieties, Okuni, Lulumo (Olulumo) and Ikom. Ikom is spoken by 80%. The language can also be known by a combination of the names of two or three varieties, including Lulumo-Ikom (Olulumo-Ikom).

References

Languages of Nigeria
Upper Cross River languages